Hemery (surname) is a surname. It may also refer to:

People 
 Calvin Hemery (b. 1995), a French tennis player
 David Hemery (b. 18 July 1944), a British athlete, winner of the 400m hurdles at the 1968 Summer Olympics
 Gabriel Hemery (b. 13 December 1968), an English forest scientist and author
 Victor Hemery (18 November 1876—9 September 1950), a champion driver of early Grand Prix motor racing

Places 
 Vingtaine de la Ville, Hemery Row, Jersey
 Le Pont Hemery, near 35370 Le Pertre, east of Rennes, Bretagne, France 
 Pont-Hemery, SE of the city of Dijon, Bourgogne, France